Polysiphonia atlantica is a small filamentous species of red marine algae Rhodophyta. The thalli form small tufts up to 3 cm long. The axes are ecorticate consisting of axial cells surrounded by four periaxial cells.

Description
Polysiphonia atlantica is a small alga 3 cm high and dark reddish-brown in colour. It grows in tufts from prostrate axes producing numerous erect branches all growing to the similar lengths. The axial cells are surrounded by 4 periaxial cells which are elongate to the same length as the axial cells which are ecorticate. Attached by rhizoids produced by the periaxial cells.

Reproduction
The life history is a sequence of three phases: gametangial, carposporangial and tetrasporangial. The plants are dioecious with spermatangial branchlets at the apices of the branches, cystocarps are slightly urceolate. The tetrasporangia occur the branches in a straight series.

Habitat
Growing on rock, mussels other invertebrates or epiphytic. Between high and low water levels.

Distribution
Records have been made from the British Isles- England, Ireland, Wales and Scotland, to Morocco, east coast of America and the Indian Ocean. Most of the records from the British Isles are probably those of Polysiphonia stricta.

References

Rhodomelaceae